Herbert Angus Fulton (3 October 1872 – 23 December 1951) was an Indian-born English first-class cricketer who played one match for Worcestershire against Leicestershire, in 1914. His part in the drawn game was minimal: he scored 2 not out from number 11 in his only innings, and made no dismissals.

Fulton was born in Bangalore; he died at the age of 79 in Minehead, Somerset.

External links 
 

1872 births
1951 deaths
English cricketers
Worcestershire cricketers
People from Minehead
Bedfordshire cricketers
Wicket-keepers